Elections in the Turks and Caicos Islands are carried out at a national level, with the country divided into fifteen constituencies. Each constituency returns one member to the Legislative Council.

Elections must be held at least every four years, though can be called at an earlier date, as happened in 1991.

Currently the Turks and Caicos Islands have a two-party system, with the Progressive National Party and People's Democratic Movement vying for power; no other party put up candidates in the 2007 elections.

Latest elections

See also
Electoral calendar
Electoral system

References

 
Politics of the Turks and Caicos Islands